Club Deportivo América, commonly known as América de Manta, was an Ecuadorian football club based in Manta. Founded in 1923, it participated in the Serie A  for two seasons in 1964 and 1966. It dissolved in 1995.

References

Defunct football clubs in Ecuador
Association football clubs established in 1923
Association football clubs disestablished in 1995
1923 establishments in Ecuador
1990 disestablishments in Ecuador